Yin Li (born August 1962) is a Chinese public health scientist and politician, currently serving as party secretary of Beijing Municipality and being a member of the Politburo of the Chinese Communist Party.

Previously, he served as party secretary of Fujian Province from 2020 to 2022, governor of Sichuan Province from 2016 to 2020, deputy party secretary of Sichuan Province from 2015 to 2020, deputy director of China Food and Drug Administration from 2013 to 2015, and Vice Minister of Health of China from 2008 to 2013. 

A health professional with diverse international experience, he also served on the Executive Board of the World Health Organization from 2004 to 2005 and was elected vice chairman of the Executive Board.

Early life and education
Yin was born in Linyi County, Shandong Province, China. He studied at Shandong Provincial Experimental High School as a student of the class of 1980.

At Shandong Medical University, Yin received his undergraduate education in medicine from 1980 to 1986 and graduate studies in social medicine and health management from 1986 to 1988. After that, he traveled to the Soviet Union in 1988 and received a doctorate in health economics and health care management from the Russian Academy of Medical Sciences.

Career 
Yin returned to China in 1993 and started his career as a cadre of the Department of Education, Science, Culture and Health at the Research Office of the State Council. Later at the research office, he served as the head of its international department and as an inspection officer.

From 2002 to 2003, Yin served as a visiting scholar at the Harvard School of Public Health. In May 2003, he began work at the Ministry of Health, where he served as deputy chief of staff, international cooperation director, chief of staff, and by September 2008, Vice Minister of Health. In 2004, he joined the executive committee of the World Health Organization.

In February 2012, he was named head of the State Drug Administration. In April 2013, he was named deputy director of the newly created National Health and Family Planning Commission, and deputy director of the China Food and Drug Administration, which was the result of the amalgamation of several government departments.

In March 2015, he started to serve as deputy party secretary of Sichuan Province; in May 2015, he also became provincial publicity chief. It was notable that prior to 2015, Yin had no regional political experience at all. On 29 January 2016, Yin assumed the post of Governor of Sichuan after his predecessor Wei Hong resigned in the wake of an internal party investigation into his conduct. Yin was the first provincial Governor to swear allegiance to the Constitution as part of his inauguration ceremony.

On December 1, 2020, Yin was appointed as the party secretary of Fujian Province. He served until November 13, 2022.

Yin was an alternate member of the 18th Central Committee of the Chinese Communist Party and is a full member of the 19th Central Committee. He is a member of the 20th Politburo of the Chinese Communist Party.

References

External links 
 Biography

Politicians from Dezhou
1962 births
Living people
Governors of Sichuan
Shandong University alumni
Alternate members of the 18th Central Committee of the Chinese Communist Party
Members of the 19th Central Committee of the Chinese Communist Party
Members of the 20th Politburo of the Chinese Communist Party
Delegates to the 13th National People's Congress
Delegates to the 12th National People's Congress